A total of three business routes of U.S. Route 12 currently exist in Wisconsin. Business routes typically run through cities, after a highway was realigned. None are official state highways according to the Wisconsin Department of Transportation (WisDOT) and are thus locally maintained.

Eau Claire 

Business U.S. Highway 12 (Bus. US 12) was a business loop in Eau Claire. Between the mid-1940s to 1964, WIS 172 served as the business route of US 12 in Eau Claire. During this time, there were several alterations made on that route. Then, Bus. US 12 was formed to run along WIS 172, forming a brief concurrency. Within a year after the formation, WIS 172 was decommissioned in favor of the new business route. During its existence, nothing significant had happened to the routing. In 1995, the business route was decommissioned.

Lake Delton–Baraboo 

Business Highway 12 in Lake Delton follows the old alignment of US 12. It is co-signed as CTH-BD; extending until West Baraboo.

In Baraboo, it follows the former alignment of US 12 through the city of Baraboo. It is concurrent with Wisconsin Highway 33 and Wisconsin Highway 113.

Sauk Prairie 

Business Highway 12 in Sauk City and Prairie du Sac (collectively called "Sauk Prairie") follows the former alignment of US 12. It is concurrent with Wisconsin Highway 78 for much of its length.

Madison 

Business U.S. Highway 12 (Bus. US 12) was a business loop in Madison. After the Madison Beltline was almost finished, Bypass U.S. Highway 12, as well as Bypass WIS 13, Bypass US 14, and Bypass US 18, temporarily take over the bypass. After the beltline was completed, all bypass routes on the beltline was replaced by their parent route (US 12, US 14, US 18, and WIS 13). As a result, City U.S. Highway 12, as well as City US 14 and City WIS 13, was formed. As of 1963, all city routes, including City US 12, were turned into business routes. Around the early 1970s, all of Madison's business routes (except for the already-decommissioned Bus. WIS 13) were decommissioned.

Whitewater 

Business Highway 12 in Whitewater follows the former alignment of US 12. From west to east, it follows Main Street, Milwaukee Street, and part of Wisconsin Highway 59 (which runs concurrent with WIS 59 for some of its length).

References 

U.S. Route 12
12 in Wisconsin
12